Mithracidae is a family of crustaceans belonging to the order Decapoda.

Genera

Genera:

Ala 
Amphithrax 
Hemus 
Maguimithrax 
Microphrys 
Mithraculus 
Mithrax 
Nemausa 
Nonala 
Omalacantha 
Petramithrax 
Pitho 
Teleophrys 
Thoe

References

Decapods